Vice Admiral James Andrew Fulton CMM, CD (23 January 1927 – 7 August 2021) was a Canadian Forces officer who served as Commander Maritime Command from 6 August 1980 to 29 July 1983.

Career
Fulton joined the Royal Canadian Navy in 1944 and completed his training in 1946. He became Commanding Officer of the frigate  in 1961 while he was Lieutenant-Commander (LCdr), Deputy Program Manager Missile Systems 1962 and Director of Naval Operations at National Defence Headquarters in 1964. He went on to be Commanding Officer of the destroyer  in 1965 with the rank of Commander (Cdr), Deputy Representative of the Supreme Allied Commander Atlantic at NATO Headquarters in Paris in 1966 and Commanding Officer of the supply ship  in 1969 as Capitain (Capt (N)). After that he became Commander Northern Region in 1973, Director General Current Policy in 1975 and Chief of Personnel (Careers & Senior Appointments) in 1976. His last appointments were as Canadian Military Representative to the NATO Military Committee in 1978 and Commander Maritime Command on 6 August 1980, in which role he undertook some astute political manoeuvring to get the Patrol Frigate Project and Tribal Update and Modernization Project approved, before retiring on 29 July 1983.

He died on 7 August 2021 in Halifax, Nova Scotia.

Awards and decorations

Fulton's personal awards and decorations include the following:

115px

120px120px

References

Canadian admirals
2021 deaths
Royal Canadian Navy officers
Commanders of the Order of Military Merit (Canada)
1927 births
Military personnel from Ottawa
Commanders of the Royal Canadian Navy
Royal Canadian Navy personnel of World War II